The 26th Information Operations Wing is an inactive United States Air Force unit. Its last assignment was with United States Air Forces in Europe at Ramstein Air Base, Germany, where it was inactivated on 5 July 2006.

The wing was first established during World War II as the 5th Photographic Group with Twelfth and Fifteenth Air Forces in the Mediterranean Theatre of Operations.

The 26th Strategic Reconnaissance Wing operated under the direction of Strategic Air Command from 1952 until 1958.  The two units were consolidated in 1965 as the 26th Tactical Reconnaissance Wing and served for the next twenty-six years with United States Air Forces Europe.  The wing was inactivated on 31 July 1991.

The wing was activated again as the 26th Intelligence Wing in late 1991, redesignated 26th Information Operations Wing in August 2000, and inactivated in July 2006.

History

World War II

The wing's first predecessor was activated in July 1942 as the 5th Photographic Group at what would become Peterson Field, Colorado with the 21st, 22d, 23d and 24th Photographic Mapping Squadrons assigned, although neither the group nor any of its squadrons would become operational until January 1943. However, by the time the group moved overseas in August 1943, only the 23d and 24th Squadrons remained assigned.

After training in the United States and participating in military exercises, the group moved to Tunisia and served in combat with Twelfth and Fifteenth Air Forces in the Mediterranean Theater of Operations.  The unit operated primarily with Lockheed F-5 Lightnings, ranging as far as Germany and Poland.  It also flew night photographic missions with its Boeing B-17F Flying Fortress and North American B-25D Mitchell aircraft.  The 5th Group provided photographic coverage for landing areas for Operation Shingle, the Allied landings at Anzio.

The unit provided road and rail target reconnaissance for the United States Fifth Army and British Eighth Army and performed bomb damage assessment photography to measure the success of allied bombing.  It flew missions to northwestern France to photograph rail targets to be attacked in preparation for Operation Overlord, the invasion of Normandy in June 1944.  Closer to home, it performed similar missions for Operation Dragoon, the invasion of southern France in August.  The group earned a Distinguished Unit Citation in September when it secured intelligence of Luftwaffe installations in the Balkans that enabled fighter aircraft to destroy large numbers of Luftwaffe fighters and transports.

The group remained in Italy after VE Day until October 1945, when it returned to the United States and was inactivated on arrival at the port of embarkation.

Strategic Air Command

In May 1952 the 26th Strategic Reconnaissance Wing was activated under Strategic Air Command as one of two Boeing B-47 Stratojet wings at  Lockbourne Air Force Base, Ohio, but was not fully manned until January 1953.  The wing performed strategic reconnaissance and air refueling missions.  The wing became non-operational in April 1958 and was inactivated in July.

Tactical Reconnaissance in Europe
The 5th Group and 26th Wing were consolidated in 1965 as the 26th Tactical Reconnaissance Wing and served for the next twenty-six years with United States Air Forces Europe.  Exercising control of a deployed Aerospace Defense Command squadron, it also performed electronic countermeasure training through the late 1960s.  From 1968 to 1973, it added an air defense responsibility.  It performed day and night visual and photographic reconnaissance.  From the fall of 1972 to spring of 1973 the wing also had a special operations mission.

With the end of the Cold War in 1990, the wing was gradually phased down. In addition, the 1960s-era McDonnell RF-4C Phantoms were increasingly costing more and more to maintain. Tactical reconnaissance was being handled by other means, and the need for the wing was becoming less critical to USAFE planners. As a result, the RF-4Cs of the wing were sent to AMARC on 1 April 1991 and the wing's remaining tactical squadron was inactivated. The wing was inactivated on 31 July 1991.

Intelligence operations
The 26th Intelligence Wing was activated in October.   It was renamed the 26th Information Operations Wing in 2000 and inactivated in 2006.

Lineage
5th Reconnaissance Group
 Established as the 5th Photographic Group on 14 July 1942
 Activated on 23 July 1942
 Redesignated 5th Photographic Reconnaissance and Mapping Group on 15 May 1943
 Redesignated 5th Photographic Reconnaissance Group on 15 August 1943
 Redesignated 5th Photographic Group, Reconnaissance on 13 November 1943
 Redesignated 5th Reconnaissance Group on 4 May 1945
 Inactivated on 28 October 1945
 Disbanded on 6 March 1947
 Reconstituted and consolidated with 26th Strategic Reconnaissance Wing on 19 April 1965

26th Strategic Reconnaissance Wing
 Constituted as the 26th Strategic Reconnaissance Wing, Medium on 9 May 1952
 Activated on 28 May 1952
 Inactivated on 1 July 1958
 Consolidated with 5th Reconnaissance Group and redesignated 26th Tactical Reconnaissance Wing on 19 April 1965
 Activated on 1 July 1965
 Inactivated on 31 July 1991
 Redesignated 26th Intelligence Wing
 Activated on 1 October 1991
 Redesignated 26th Information Operations Wing on 1 August 2000
 Inactivated on 5 July 2006

Assignments
 Second Air Force, 23 July 1942
 Third Air Force, 8 March 1943
 Twelfth Air Force, 4 September 1943 (attached to Northwest African Photographic Reconnaissance Wing, until 21 November 1943)
 90th Photographic Wing, 22 November 1943
 [Fifteenth Air Force, 1 October 1944
 Army Service Forces, New York Port of Embarkation, c. 26 – 28 October 1945
 801st Air Division, 28 May 1952 – 1 July 1958 (attached to 7th Air Division, 13 September – 29 October 1954)
 United States Air Forces in Europe, 1 July 1965 – 31 July 1991

Stations
 Army Air Base, Colorado Springs (later Peterson Field), Colorado, 23 July 1942 – 8 August 1943
 La Marsa Airfield, Tunisia, 8 September 1943
 San Severo Airfield, Italy, 8 December 1943
 Bari Airfield, Italy, 11 October 1944 – Oct 1945
 Camp Kilmer, New Jersey, 26 – 28 October 1945
 Lockbourne Air Force Base, Ohio, 28 May 1952 – 1 July 1958
 Toul-Rosières Air Base, France 1 July 1965
 Ramstein Air Base, Germany, 1 October 1966
 Zweibrücken Air Base, 31 January 1973 – 31 July 1991
 Ramstein Air Base, Germany, 1 October 1991 – 5 July 2006

Components

Operational Units
 World War II

 12th Photographic Squadron (later 12th Photographic Reconnaissance Squadron): attached 27 October – 21 November 1943
 15th Photographic Squadron (later 15th Combat Mapping Squadron, 15th Photographic Reconnaissance Squadron): attached 21 November 1943 – 20 January 1944, assigned 21 January 1944 – 28 October 1945
 21st Photographic Reconnaissance Squadron (later 21st Photographic Squadron): 2 September 1942 – 28 April 1943 (not operational until c. 12 January 1943)
 22d Photographic Reconnaissance Squadron (later 22d Photographic Squadron): 2 September 1942 – 7 July 1943 (not operational until c. 12 January 1943; detached after 18 May 1943)
 23d Photographic Reconnaissance Squadron (later 23d Photographic Squadron, 23d Photographic Reconnaissance Squadron): 2 September 1942 – 15 November 1944 (not operational until c. 12 January 1943; detached c. 15 July – 8 September 1943, 9 February – 9 March 1944, after 23 August 1944)
 24th Photographic Mapping Squadron (later 24th Photographic Squadron, 24th Combat Mapping Squadron): 2 September 1942 – 9 October 1943 (not operational until c. 12 January 1943; detached after c. 8 August 1943)
 32d Photographic Reconnaissance Squadron: attached 30 April – 14 November 1944, assigned 15 November 1944 – 28 October 1945
 37th Photographic Mapping Squadron: 15 November 1944 – 28 October 1945

 Strategic Air Command
 3d Strategic Reconnaissance Squadron: 28 May 1952 – 1 July 1958 (not operational until 1 March 1953 and after 15 April 1958)
 4th Strategic Reconnaissance Squadron: 28 May 1952 – 1 July 1958
 10th Strategic Reconnaissance Squadron: 28 May 1952 – 1 July 1958 (not operational until c. 1 October 1953 and after 15 April 1958)
 26th Air Refueling Squadron: 28 May 1952 – 1 April 1955 (detached until 31 May 1953)
 321st Air Refueling Squadron: 16 August 1956 – 15 April 1958

 United States Air Forces Europe

 7th Special Operations Squadron: 17 March 1972 – 31 January 1973
 7th Tactical Fighter Squadron: attached 24 August – 1 October 1971
 8th Tactical Fighter Squadron: attached 15 September – 8 October 1970 and 24 August – 1 October 1971
 17th Tactical Reconnaissance Squadron: 31 January 1973 – 1 January 1979
 19th Tactical Reconnaissance Squadron: 1 July – 1 October 1965
 22d Tactical Reconnaissance Squadron: 1 December 1965 – 20 September 1966; attached 9 – 26 October 1968
 32d Tactical Reconnaissance Squadron: 1 October 1965 – 15 August 1966
 38th Tactical Reconnaissance Squadron: 1 January 1966 – 1 April 1991
 526th Fighter-Interceptor (later, 526th Tactical Fighter) Squadron: 1 November 1968 – 31 January 1973
 4713th Defense Systems Evaluation Squadron: attached 20 October – 4 November 1966, 21 May – 30 June 1967, 21 September – 6 October 1967.

Support Units
 Groups
 26th Combat Support Group: 1 July 1965 – 31 July 1991
 26th Medical Group (later 26th Tactical Hospital): 28 July 1952 – 1 July 1958, 1 May 1967 – 15 January 1973, 31 January 1973 – c. 1988

 Squadrons
 4th Photographic Technical Squadron: October 1944 – September 1945
 26th Armament and Electronics Maintenance Squadron (later 26th Avionics Maintenance Squadron, 26th Component Repair Squadron): 28 May 1953 – 1 July 1958, 1 July 1965 – 31 July 1991
 26th Field Maintenance Squadron (later 26th Equipment Maintenance Squadron): 28 May 1953 – 1 July 1958, 1 July 1965 – 31 July 1991
 26th Munitions Maintenance Squadron: 8 October 1972 – 15 January 1973
 26th Periodic Maintenance Squadron (later 26th Organizational Maintenance Squadron, 26th Aircraft Generation Squadron): 28 May 1953 – 1 July 1958, 1 July 1965 – 1 January 1966, 31 January 1973 – 31 July 1991
 26th Reconnaissance Technical Squadron: 1 July 1969 – 1 October 1971
 326th Munitions Maintenance Squadron: 1 May 1970 – 7 October 1972
 Tactical Reconnaissance Intelligence Support Squadron, Provisional, 7426: attached c. 1 January 1985 – 15 March 1985
 7426th Tactical Reconnaissance Intelligence Support Squadron: 15 March 1985 – c. 31 July 1991

 Other
 USAF Dispensary, Ramstein (later USAF Clinic, Ramstein); 1 July 1971 – 31 January 1973
 USAF Clinic, Zweibrücken (later 26th Tactical Reconnaissance Wing Clinic): 31 January 1973 – 1 July 1991
 26th Tactical Hospital (see 26th Medical Group): 1 May 1967 – 15 January 1973, 31 January 1973 – 31 July 1991

Aircraft

 Lockheed P-38F Lightning, 1942–1945
 Lockheed F-4 Lightning, 1942–1945
 Lockheed F-5 Lightning, 1943–1945
 Consolidated B-24J Liberator, 1943–1945
 Consolidated F-7 Liberator, 1943–1945
 Boeing B-17F Flying Fortress, 1943–1945
 Boeing F-9 Flying Fortress, 1943–1945
 North American B-25D Mitchell, 1943–1945
 North American F-10 Mitchell, 1943–1945
 Douglas A-20C Havoc, 1944–1945
 Douglas F-3 Havoc, 1944–1945
 Boeing RB-47 Stratojet, 1952–1958
 Boeing KC-97 Stratofreighter, 1952–1958
 Douglas RB-66B Destroyer 1965
 McDonnell RF-101C Voodo, 1965
 McDonnell RF-4C Phantom 1965–1991

References

Notes

Citations

Bibliography
 
 
 

 Further reading

External links
 
 USAAS-USAAC-USAAF-USAF Aircraft Serial Numbers—1908 to present

0026
Military units and formations established in 1952
1942 establishments in Colorado